Chimney Peak is located along the border of Alberta and British Columbia on the Continental Divide just south of Quadra Mountain. It was named in 1910 by T.G. Longstaff and Captain E.O. Wheeler who made its first ascent through a chimney.

See also
 List of peaks on the British Columbia–Alberta border
 List of mountains in the Canadian Rockies

References

Three-thousanders of Alberta
Three-thousanders of British Columbia
Canadian Rockies